The Virgin of Stamboul is a 1920 American silent drama film directed by Tod Browning and starring husband and wife team Priscilla Dean and Wheeler Oakman and  featuring Wallace Beery in a supporting role.

Plot
Based upon a review in a film publication, Sari (Dean) is a beggar girl of the streets of Stamboul, near Constantinople, who attracts the attention of Captain Pemberton (Oakman), a soldier of fortune, who has recruited the Black Horse cavalry to maintain law and order. Sari overhears him being told that her soul is as filthy as the streets, so she goes to pray in a mosque although she knows Turkish women are not allowed to enter. There she witnesses a revenge murder by a sheik (Beery), who then attempts to lure her into his harem. She defies him, and he then tries to purchase her. Pemberton returns from the desert and has determined that he loves Sari. The sheik then carries both Pemberton and Sari to his fortified camp outside the city walls. Sari escapes and gets the Black Horse cavalry to attack the camp, resulting in a battle and rescue.

Cast
 Priscilla Dean as Sari
 Wheeler Oakman as Capt. Carlisle Pemberton
 Wallace Beery as Ahmed Hamid (segment "Achmet Bey")
 Clyde Benson as Diplomat
 E. Alyn Warren as Yusef Bey
 Nigel De Brulier as Capt. Kassari
 Edmund Burns as Hector Baron
 Eugenie Forde as Sari's Mother
 Ethel Ritchie as Resha

Production
Universal Studios Carl Laemmle provided director Tod Browning with ample resources to create an authentic replica of Istanbul that featured “bazaars, harems, the desert, and elaborate costuming.”

Marketing
To market the film, Harry Reichenbach in a publicity stunt had a "sheik" from Constantinople with his entourage check into the Majestic Hotel in New York City on March 7, 1920. Newspapers carried the story of his visit looking for an American heiress who had left with a marine just as the first teaser ads for the film were being published. Several ads noted the film's reported production budget of $500,000.

Footnotes

References
Rosenthal, Stuart.  1975. Tod Browning: The Hollywood Professionals, Volume 4. The Tantivy Press. 
Sobchack, Vivian. 2006. The Films of Tod Browning: An Overview Long Past in The Films of Tod Browning in The Films of Tod Browning, editor Bernd Herzogenrath, 2006 Black Dog Publishing. London. pp. 21–39.

External links

1920 films
1920 drama films
Silent American drama films
American silent feature films
American black-and-white films
Films directed by Tod Browning
Universal Pictures films
1920s American films